Austroboletus mutabilis is a species of bolete fungus found in northern Australia. Described as new to science in 2006, it grows in dry sclerophyll woodlands. This bolete is characterised by its colour change—from deep red to orange and, finally, to yellow—that occurs in the cap. Almost no other Bolete goes through such a dramatic colour change as this species and this change may occur as a consequence of time, exposure to sunlight and/or local humidity.

Austroboletus mutabilis was identified as a new species of Austroboletus by Halling, Osmundson and Neves in a 2006 paper and is known to grow at a few sites in Northern Queensland.

References

Fungi described in 2006
Fungi native to Australia
mutabilis